The Polish Centre (PC) was a political alliance in Poland.

History
The PC was an alliance of Narodowe Zjednoczenie Ludowe, the Catholic People's Party and Polski Związek Kresowy. It received around 3% of the vote in the 1922 elections, winning six seats in the Sejm.

References

Defunct political party alliances in Poland